Aliya Assymova (Äliia Asymova; , born 16 December 1997 in Taldykorgan, Kazakhstan) is a Kazakhstani individual rhythmic gymnast.

Career 
Assymova debuted as a senior in 2013 season and has represented her nation at international competitions. She has competed in three World Championships (2013 in Kyiv, 2014 in Izmir and 2015 in Stuttgart). Assymova won a bronze in team event at the 2014 Asian Games and at the 2015 Asian Championships.

References

External links 

 
 Rhythmic Gymnastics Results

1997 births
Living people
Kazakhstani rhythmic gymnasts
Asian Games medalists in gymnastics
Gymnasts at the 2014 Asian Games
Asian Games bronze medalists for Kazakhstan
Medalists at the 2014 Asian Games
People from Taldykorgan
21st-century Kazakhstani women